Robert Lee Boston (July 4, 1918 – July 2, 2002) was an American baseball player in the Negro leagues. He played with the Homestead Grays during their 1948 Negro World Series championship season.

References

External links
 and Seamheads

Homestead Grays players
1918 births
2002 deaths
Baseball players from Georgia (U.S. state)
Baseball outfielders
People from McDuffie County, Georgia
20th-century African-American sportspeople
21st-century African-American people